Theophilus "Doctor" Doctorson Khumalo  (born 26 June 1967), also known as Doctor Khumalo, is a South African former football player. He is best known for being a star midfielder for Kaizer Chiefs as well as the South African national team.

Career
Having started playing soccer in 1984 with Swallows Reserves, Khumalo then went to Kaizer Chiefs, where he initially played for the junior team. His father, Eliakim Khumalo, a renowned player of the 1970s and early 1980s, served as his mentor. Khumalo was promoted to the senior team by coach Ted Dumitru the following year, when he started a game against arch rivals Orlando Pirates.

Khumalo went on to become a star player for Kaizer Chiefs and did not play for any other South African soccer club, only leaving them for short overseas playing periods – he signed with FIFA agent Marcelo Houseman who first took him to Argentinian club Ferro Carril Oeste for six months in 1995, while in 1996 and 1997 he played for the Columbus Crew of Major League Soccer.

The high-point of Khumalo's soccer career was the 1990s; he was part of the Kaizer Chiefs teams that won three South African league championship titles and five knockout trophies and was also voted South African Footballer of the Year in 1992. During his career at the club, he played in a total of 397 league and cup games, scoring 90 goals.

After the re-admission of South Africa to FIFA in 1992, Khumalo was selected to be a member of the South African squad for its first official international match in July of the same year, against Cameroon. South Africa won the match 1–0, due to a penalty scored by Khumalo. He was also a leading member of the winning South African national team at the 1996 African Nations Cup. He also represented South Africa in the 1998 Football World Cup. Throughout his whole international career, he played for South Africa 50 times (twice as captain), scoring nine goals making him the 13th most capped South African footballer.

One of Doctor Khumalo's most memorable games was perhaps the 1996 Mandela Cup match, where South Africa played against Brazil. Phil Masinga scored the first goal from Doctor Khumalo's corner kick. Khumalo then scored the second goal to make the score 2–0 in favour of the South Africans. Unfortunately for Bafana, Brazil came back in the second half, scoring three goals, to win the encounter 3–2.

He retired in 2002 and then in 2004 as a player-coach. Although he was a winning co-coach (with Donald "Ace" Khuse) of Kaizer Chiefs in the 2002–2003 season (guiding the club to a 12-game unbeaten record and earning themselves a joint Coach of the Month PSL award), Khumalo has stated that his aim is to become a soccer administrator. Since 2004, Khumalo served as a television soccer commentator and presenter, being named afterwards South African Under-17 national coach.

Khumalo was voted 62nd in the Top 100 Great South Africans in 2004. He is married to Namibian beauty queen Blanche Garises.

Coaching career
He has a SAFA Level 1, Level 2 and Level 3 coaching licences, an English Football Association licence which he got in 2005 and a UEFA B licence through the German Football Federation in 2007. He previously worked as head coach for the Kaizer Chiefs Under-17 team and together with Khuse. He was the assistant coach for Kaizer Chiefs

Acting career
Khumalo made his film acting debut with the German/South African production Themba. He plays himself as the coach of the under 21s. The movie is about Themba, a young and ambitious football youth, who is faced with poverty, AIDS and violence, but eventually makes his way on to the South African national team. The film is based on a novel by Lutz van Dijk and premiered at the Berlinale 2010.

Career statistics

International goals
Scores and results list South Africa's goal tally first, score column indicates score after each Khumalo goal.

References

External links
 Doctor Khumalo
 Argentine Primera statistics at Fútbol XXI  
 Doctor Khumalo: The Story of a Bafana Legend

1967 births
Living people
Sportspeople from Soweto
Soccer players from Gauteng
Zulu people
South African soccer players
South African expatriate soccer players
South Africa international soccer players
Columbus Crew players
Ferro Carril Oeste footballers
Expatriate footballers in Argentina
Expatriate soccer players in the United States
1996 African Cup of Nations players
1997 FIFA Confederations Cup players
1998 FIFA World Cup players
Kaizer Chiefs F.C. players
Argentine Primera División players
Association football midfielders
Major League Soccer players
Major League Soccer All-Stars
South African expatriate sportspeople in the United States